Oishi may refer to:

 Ōishi (surname), a Japanese surname
 Oishi (Philippine brand), a snack company from the Philippines
 Oishi Group, a Thai food-and-drink company
 Ōishi Station, a train station in Nada-ku, Kobe, Hyōgo Prefecture, Japan
 3379 Oishi, a main-belt asteroid